Kleiner Bullensee is a lake in Rotenburg (Wümme), Lower Saxony, Germany. It lies within the Großes und Weißes Moor Naturschutzgebiet (nature reserve). A nearby lake is called Großer Bullensee.

Lakes of Lower Saxony
Rotenburg (district)